Santissima Annunziata is a Roman Catholic church located in Pescia, region of Tuscany, Italy.

History
Construction of the church began in 1600, designed by Antonio Maria Ferri, and the church was affiliated with the Barnabite order, that occupied the church until 1782. Construction was interrupted in 1631 with the sweep of the plague, and work continued until the early 18th century.

The interior contains the following altarpieces:
St Carlo Borromeo administers the sacraments to those afflicted by plague by Baldassare Franceschini
The city of Pescia pledged in veneration to the Virgin during the scourge of 1631 by Carlo Sacconi
St Filippo Neri in ecstasy before Madonna and Angels (1727) by Marcantonio Franceschini 
Madonna del Soccorso by 15th century artist.

References

17th-century Roman Catholic church buildings in Italy
Roman Catholic churches in Pescia
Baroque architecture in Tuscany